Lucas Andrés Nardi (born 7 September 1980) is an Argentine football manager and former player who played as a midfielder. He is the current head of the methodology department of Uruguayan club Montevideo City Torque.

Playing career
Nardi began his career with Estudiantes de La Plata, making his first team debut in 2000. In 2002, he was loaned to Quilmes, and subsequently went on to represent Defensa y Justicia, San Martín de Mendoza, Belgrano de Córdoba, San Martín de San Juan, Huracán de Tres Arroyos and Aldosivi before moving abroad with Paraguayan side Guaraní in 2008.

Nardi returned to his home country in 2009, joining Patronato. He subsequently played for Sportivo Belgrano before moving to hometown side  in 2010, and retired in the following year at the age of 30.

Managerial career
After retiring, Nardi worked as manager for amateur local sides before joining Banfield, initially as an assistant of the youth categories. He then worked as an assistant of Claudio Vivas in the first team before moving to his first side Estudiantes in January 2017.

On 12 July 2017, Nardi was appointed manager of another club he represented as a player, Quilmes. He resigned on 23 November, and moved to Qatar in the following year to work in the Aspire Academy.

In December 2020, after a three-month spell as manager of Qatar national under-19 team, Nardi was named Santiago Solari's assistant at Mexican side Club América. He left with Solari in March 2022, and later joined Montevideo City Torque as the head of the methodology department.

On 22 September 2022, Nardi was named interim manager of Torque until the end of the season.

References

External links

1980 births
Living people
Sportspeople from Córdoba Province, Argentina
Argentine footballers
Association football midfielders
Argentine Primera División players
Primera Nacional players
Estudiantes de La Plata footballers
Quilmes Atlético Club footballers
Defensa y Justicia footballers
San Martín de Mendoza footballers
Club Atlético Belgrano footballers
San Martín de San Juan footballers
Huracán de Tres Arroyos footballers
Aldosivi footballers
Club Atlético Patronato footballers
Sportivo Belgrano footballers
Paraguayan Primera División players
Club Guaraní players
Argentine expatriate footballers
Argentine expatriate sportspeople in Paraguay
Expatriate footballers in Paraguay
Argentine football managers
Primera B Nacional managers
Quilmes Atlético Club managers
Uruguayan Primera División managers
Montevideo City Torque managers
Club América non-playing staff
Argentine expatriate sportspeople in Qatar
Argentine expatriate sportspeople in Mexico